Garrett Kaoru Hongo (born May 30, 1951) is a Yonsei, fourth-generation Japanese American academic and poet.  His work draws on Japanese American history and his own experiences.

He was a finalist for the Pulitzer Prize for Poetry for The River of Heaven (1988).

Early life

Hongo was born in Volcano, Hawai'i. He attended Pomona College and the University of Michigan, and received a Master of Fine Arts degree in English from the University of California at Irvine.

Hongo has been awarded fellowships from the Watson Foundation, the Guggenheim Foundation, the National Endowment for the Arts, and the Rockefeller Foundation.

Career
Hongo is a professor of creative writing at the University of Oregon.  From 1989 through 1993, he was the director of the university's Program in Creative Writing.

Hongo has published three books of poetry. His first was Yellow Light (1982), and The River of Heaven (1988) was a Lamont Poetry Selection of the Academy of American Poets and a finalist for the Pulitzer Prize for Poetry. Volcano: A Memoir of Hawai'i (1995) was awarded the 2006 Oregon Book Award for Literary Nonfiction. Hongo has also worked as an editor on Songs My Mother Taught Me: Stories, Plays and Memoir by Wakako Yamauchi (1994) and on The Open Boat: Poems from Asian America (1993).

Selected works
In a statistical overview derived from writings by and about Garett Hongo, OCLC/WorldCat includes roughly 30+ works in 70+ publications in two languages and 4,600+ library holdings. 

 The Buddha Bandits down Highway 99 (1978)
 Yellow Light (University of California, Irvine, 1980; Wesleyan University Press, 1982)
 The River of Heaven (Knopf, 1988, ; Carnegie Mellon University Press, 2001)
 The Open boat: Poems from Asian America (1993)
 Volcano: A Memoir of Hawaiʻi (1995)
 Coral Road: Poems (2011)
 The Mirror Diary: Selected Essays (University of Michigan Press, 2017)
 The Perfect Sound: A Memoir in Stereo (2022)

Anthologies
"from Cruising 99", The geography of home: California's poetry of place, Editors Christopher Buckley, Gary Young, Heyday Books, 1999, 
"Yellow Light", Bold words: a century of Asian American writing, Editors Rajini Srikanth, Esther Yae Iwanaga, Rutgers University Press, 2001, 
"Kapu Tube", Hawaiʻi: true stories of the island spirit, Editors Rick Carroll, Marcie Carroll, Travelers' Tales, 1999, 
"Something Whispered in the Shakuhachi", What book!?: Buddha poems from beat to hiphop, Editor Gary Gach, Parallax Press, 1997, 
Unsettling America: an anthology of contemporary multicultural poetry, Editors Maria M. Gillan, Jennifer Gillan, Penguin Books, 1994,

See also

List of Asian American writers
List of people from Hawaii

Notes

References
 Calabrese, Joseph, and Susan Tchudi. (2006). Diversity: Strength and Struggle.  New York: Pearson Longman. ;  OCLC 60972078
 Serafin, Steven and Alfred Bendixen. (2006).  "Hongo, Garrett (Kaoru)," in The Continuum Encyclopedia of American Literature. New York: Continuum. ;  OCLC 61478088

Further reading 
 Drake, Barbara. (1992). "Garrett Kaoru Hongo," in American Poets since World War II, 3rd series (Gwynn, R. S., ed.). Detroit, Michigan: Gale. ;  OCLC 26158348
 Filipelli, Laurie. (1997). Garrett Hongo.  Boise, Idaho: Boise State University Press.	;  OCLC 37550317
 Fonseca, Anthony J. (2005). "Garrett Kaoru Hongo," in Asian American Writers (Madsen, Deborah L., ed.) Farmington Hills, Michigan: Gale. ;  OCLC 57414491
 Kamada, Roy Osamu. (2006). "Postcolonial Romanticisms: Landscape and the Possibilities of Inheritance in the Work of Jamaica Kincaid, Garrett Hongo and Derek Walcott," in Dissertation Abstracts International, Section A: The Humanities and Social Sciences, 2006 Jan; 66 (7): 2573. U of California, Davis, 2005. (dissertation abstract)
 Schröder, Nicole. (2006). Spaces and Places in Motion: Spatial Concepts in Contemporary American Literature Tübingen, Germany: Gunter Narr.  ;  OCLC 76949181
 Witonsky, Trudi. (2000). "Twilight Conversations: Multicultural Dialogue," in Asian American Studies: Identity, Images, Issues Past and Present (Ghymn, Esther Mikyung, ed.) New York: Peter Lang. ;  OCLC 40881565

 Journals
 Colley, Sharon E. "An Interview with Garrett Hongo," Forkroads: A Journal of Ethnic-American Literature, 1996 Summer; 4: 47-63.
 Hull, Glynda. "This Wooden Shack Place: the Logic of an Unconventional Reading," College Composition and Communication, 1990 Oct; 41 (3): 287-98.
 Jarman, Mark. "The Volcano Inside," The Southern Review, 1996 Spring; 32 (2): 337-43.
 McCormick, Adrienne. "Theorizing Difference in Asian American Poetry Anthologies," MELUS: The Journal of the Society for the Study of the Multi-Ethnic Literature of the United States, 2004 Fall-Winter; 29 (3-4): 59-80.
 Sato, Gayle K. "Cultural Recuperation in Garrett Hongo's The River of Heaven," Studies in American Literature (Kyoto, Japan), 2001 Feb; 37: 57-74.
 Slowik, Mary. "Beyond Lot's Wife: the Immigration Poems of Marilyn Chin, Garrett Hongo, Li-Young Lee, and David Mura," MELUS, 2000 Fall-Winter; 25 (3-4): 221-42.

External links
Academy of American Poets bio (accessed March 2008)
Modern American Poetry page (accessed March 2008)
 Interview with Hongo on Words on a Wire

1951 births
Living people
Poets from Hawaii
American poets of Asian descent
University of Oregon faculty
Pomona College alumni
Writers from Oregon
American writers of Japanese descent
University of California, Irvine alumni
University of Michigan alumni
20th-century American poets
21st-century American poets